The Milk of Human Kindness (original title: Le Lait de la tendresse humaine) is a 2001 French-Belgium drama film directed by Dominique Cabrera.

Plot 
Christelle, a mother, disappears without a trace.

Cast 

 Patrick Bruel as Laurent
 Marilyne Canto as Christelle
 Dominique Blanc as Claire
 Sergi López as Serge
 Claude Brasseur as Jean-Claude
 Mathilde Seigner as Josiane
 Valeria Bruni Tedeschi as Josiane
 Yolande Moreau as Babette
 Olivier Gourmet as Doctor Gérard Cafarelli
 Jacques Boudet as Jean-François 
 Marthe Villalonga as Marthe
 Antoine Chappey as Guy-Michel
 Bruno Salvador as Rémi
 Antoine Bonnaire as Cédric
 Nour Gana as Cendrine
 Léna Breban as Sonia
 Edmée Doroszlai as Véronique

Accolades

References

External links 

2001 films
2001 drama films
French drama films
Films directed by Dominique Cabrera
2000s French films